Edward Toussaint, Jr. (born October 7, 1941) is an American lawyer and judge from Minnesota.  For 16 years, from 1995 until July 2011, he served as a judge on the Minnesota Court of Appeals.

Toussaint was appointed Chief Judge of the Minnesota Court of Appeals in 1995 by Minnesota Governor Arne Carlson. He held the position until October 2010, when he stepped down as Chief Judge to take a seat on the court as an associate judge. He remained on the court until July 15, 2011, when he retired due to the state's mandatory retirement age.

Toussaint now serves as a professor of law at William Mitchell College of Law in Saint Paul. Before serving on the Court of Appeals, Toussaint served as a district judge in Hennepin County.

References

External links
Judge Profile, Minnesota Judicial Branch

Living people
Minnesota lawyers
Minnesota state court judges
Minnesota Court of Appeals judges
1941 births
20th-century American judges
21st-century American judges